The 1969 Vanderbilt Commodores football team represented Vanderbilt University in the 1969 NCAA University Division football season. The Commodores were led by head coach Bill Pace in his third season and finished the season with a record of four wins and six losses (4–6 overall, 2–3 in the SEC).

Schedule

Source: 1969 Vanderbilt football schedule

References

Vanderbilt
Vanderbilt Commodores football seasons
Vanderbilt Commodores football